Richard Smith is a British screenwriter and film director.  He wrote Trauma, starring Colin Firth and Mena Suvari, and multi-award-winning half-hour film, Leonard.

Biography 
A graduate in Scriptwriting from the University of Salford, he won a BAFTA Scotland award in 2002. His films have premiered at Sundance and Edinburgh Film Festival, and appeared at many others the world over. His work focuses on the psychology of loneliness, human failure and the ability/inability for people to overcome themselves. He's represented by The Rod Hall Agency in London.

His films include a feature version of Leonard (with Kinetic Arts/Crab Apple Films), an adaptation of Anthony Holden's Big Deal (with Celador) and TV movie Auntie Rita (with Scottish Media Group).

Filmography

Awards
Leonard
 The Audience Award at the 2002 Clermont Ferrand Short Film Festival
 The Organization Prize at the 2002 Algarve Film Festival, the award for Best Single Drama at the 2002 Mental Health Media Awards
 Best Fiction at the 2002 Tehran Festival.

References

External links
 

Alumni of the University of Salford
Living people
Year of birth missing (living people)
Place of birth missing (living people)
Scottish screenwriters